Cielo is the largest distributor/manufacturer of frozen yogurt ingredients in Europe.

About
Founded in 1979 in Italy, credited with launching the frozen yogurt craze in 2004, Cielo's International dist. division was launched in 1997 with branches in Singapore, Guadalajara, Mexico, Beijing, China and Chino, Ca, United States

References

External links 
Official Site
Forbes Article

Dairy products companies of Italy
Food and drink companies established in 1979
Italian companies established in 1979